Trichogypsia is a genus of calcareous sponges in the order Baerida.

Taxonomy
The following species are recognised in the genus Trichogypsia:
 Trichogypsia alaskensis Lehnert & Stone, 2017
 Trichogypsia incrustans (Haeckel, 1872)
 Trichogypsia villosa Carter, 1871

References

Leucosolenida
Taxa named by Henry John Carter